This is a list of airlines currently operating in Myanmar.

Scheduled airlines

Charter airlines

See also
 List of defunct airlines of Myanmar
 List of airports in Myanmar
 List of airlines

References

 https://web.archive.org/web/20060209025331/http://www.yangonair.com/
 https://web.archive.org/web/20170406145458/http://www.jetradar-asia.com/

Airlines
Myanmar
Airlines
Myanmar